Baltic is a city on the Big Sioux River in northern Minnehaha County, South Dakota, United States. The population was 1,246 at the 2020 census.

History
Baltic was originally called St. Olaf, and under the latter name was laid out in 1881. Another variant name was Keyes. A post office was established under the name Saint Olaf in 1872, the name was changed to Keyes in 1887, and the name was again changed to Baltic in 1889. The Chicago, Milwakuee, Saint Paul and Pacific Railroad built through Baltic and established a railroad depot.

Geography
Baltic is located at  (43.762331, -96.737707), along the Big Sioux River.

Demographics

2010 census
As of the census of 2010, there were 1,089 people, 389 households, and 302 families living in the city. The racial makeup of the city was 95.4% White, 0.5% African American, 0.9% Native American, 2.1% from other races, and 1.1% from two or more races. Hispanic or Latino of any race were 2.2% of the population.

There were 389 households, of which 47.0% had children under the age of 18 living with them, 60.4% were married couples living together, 10.3% had a female householder with no husband present, 6.9% had a male householder with no wife present, and 22.4% were non-families. 19.0% of all households were made up of individuals, and 5.2% had someone living alone who was 65 years of age or older. The average household size was 2.80 and the average family size was 3.20.

The median age in the city was 30.9 years. 32.8% of residents were under the age of 18; 7.4% were between the ages of 18 and 24; 33% were from 25 to 44; 20.7% were from 45 to 64; and 6.2% were 65 years of age or older. The gender makeup of the city was 51.0% male and 49.0% female.

2000 census
As of the census of 2000, there were 811 people, 300 households, and 233 families living in the city. The population density was 1,151.4 people per square mile (447.3/km2). There were 311 housing units at an average density of 441.5 per square mile (171.5/km2). The racial makeup of the city was 98.89% White, 0.49% Native American, and 0.62% from two or more races. Hispanic or Latino of any race were 0.12% of the population.

There were 300 households, out of which 42.7% had children under the age of 18 living with them, 62.0% were married couples living together, 11.3% had a female householder with no husband present, and 22.3% were non-families. 18.7% of all households were made up of individuals, and 7.7% had someone living alone who was 65 years of age or older. The average household size was 2.70 and the average family size was 3.08.

In the city, the population was spread out, with 30.2% under the age of 18, 10.6% from 18 to 24, 31.8% from 25 to 44, 18.6% from 45 to 64, and 8.8% who were 65 years of age or older. The median age was 30 years. For every 100 females, there were 93.6 males. For every 100 females age 18 and over, there were 95.8 males.

As of 2000 the median income for a household in the city was $46,023, and the median income for a family was $50,000. Males had a median income of $30,188 versus $22,260 for females. The per capita income for the city was $16,268. About 3.3% of families and 3.9% of the population were below the poverty line, including 5.3% of those under age 18 and 4.9% of those age 65 or over.

Education
Baltic Public Schools are part of Baltic School District. The three schools in the district include Baltic Elementary School, Baltic Middle School and Baltic High School.

The school district is surrounded by the Dell Rapids School District.  The Baltic School District mascot is the Bulldog.

Culture
Baltic River Park Days is a family friendly event taking place the 3rd weekend of July. The Scenic River Park is the backdrop for free movies in the park, kickball, tug of war, bean bags, kids games, duck races, show and shine and a Grand Parade.

Transportation
While Baltic is situated between (and within just a few mile of) both Interstate 29 and Highway 115, neither highway passes through the city. Access to both highways is via east–west 250th Street.

Notable people
 Nils Boe, Governor of South Dakota from 1965 to 1969.
 Hans Ustrud, Lieutenant Governor of South Dakota from 1933 to 1935

See also
 List of cities in South Dakota

References

External links

 
 Baltic, South Dakota Historic Photos

Cities in South Dakota
Cities in Minnehaha County, South Dakota
Sioux Falls, South Dakota metropolitan area